"Put It All on Me" is a song by English singer-songwriter Ed Sheeran from his compilation album, No.6 Collaborations Project (2019), released through Asylum Records and Atlantic Records on 12 July 2019. It features English singer-songwriter Ella Mai. The song was written by Sheeran, Howell and Fred Gibson, with the latter handling the production.

Lyrics
The lyrics of the song is about someone they love and how they can always rely on each other. It describes the affection between Sheeran and Mai then the former sings about how he needs the touch and warmth of his woman following a hard day of interaction with the world. Also, his girl is his escape into bliss. The chorus of the song deals with Sheeran offering the girl the same patronage while inviting his girl to put all her troubles and worries on him hoping that he will absorb them away from her. Mai had a hard time putting words about how she feels for Sheeran. In this relationship, the couple created a perfect balance as they rely and depend on each other which is quite beautiful.

Lyric video
A lyric video for the song was uploaded on Sheeran's YouTube account on 12 July 2019.

Music video
A music video for the song was released on 22 December 2019, which was directed by Jason Koenig.

Chart performance
"Put It All on Me" charted at number 48, 71, 3 and 22 in Australia, Canada, Swedish Heatseeker Chart and Bubbling Under Hot 100, respectively.

Charts

Certifications

References

2019 songs
Songs written by Ed Sheeran
Songs written by Ella Mai
Songs written by Fred Again
Ed Sheeran songs
Song recordings produced by Fred Again